The Rawil Pass (el. 2429 m.) (German: Rawilpass) is a high mountain pass across the western Bernese Alps, connecting Lenk in the canton of Berne in Switzerland and Anzère or Crans Montana in the canton of Valais.

The pass lies between the Wildhorn on the west and the Wildstrubel on the east. Lac de Tseuzier is located south of the pass.

See also
 List of mountain passes in Switzerland

External links 
List of Alpine passes in switzerland

Mountain passes of Switzerland
Mountain passes of the Alps
Mountain passes of Valais
Bern–Valais border
Mountain passes of the canton of Bern